Nay Myo Aung (born 19 July 1986) is an athlete from Myanmar, who competes in archery.

2012 Summer Olympics
At the 2012 Summer Olympics in London Nay finished his ranking round with a total of 646 points, which made him the 56th seed for the final competition bracket in which he faced Romain Girouille in the first round. Nay won the match by 6-5 and advance to second round. In second round, Nay faced Markiyan Ivashko and then he lost Ivashko by 1-7 and Nay was eliminated.

2008 Summer Olympics
At the 2008 Summer Olympics in Beijing Nay finished his ranking round with a total of 637 points, which gave him the 52nd seed for the final competition bracket in which he faced Rafał Dobrowolski in the first round. Dobrowolski won the match by 110-106 and Nay was eliminated.

References

External links
 
 
 
 

1986 births
Living people
Burmese male archers
Archers at the 2008 Summer Olympics
Archers at the 2012 Summer Olympics
Olympic archers of Myanmar
Archers at the 2010 Asian Games
Archers at the 2014 Asian Games
Asian Games competitors for Myanmar
Sportspeople from Yangon